Coeranoscincus is a genus of skinks. They are endemic to Australia and found in eastern Queensland and northeastern New South Wales.

Species
There are two species:
Coeranoscincus frontalis (De Vis, 1888) – limbless snake-tooth skink
Coeranoscincus reticulatus (Günther, 1873) – three-toed snake-tooth skink

References

 
Lizard genera
Skinks of Australia
Endemic fauna of Australia
Taxa named by Richard Walter Wells
Taxa named by Cliff Ross Wellington